This is a list of occult rock bands. Occult rock is a proto-metal style of rock music.

 Acid King
 Antonius Rex
 Aphrodite's Child
 Bang
 Black Sabbath
 Black Widow
 Blood Ceremony
 Bloody Hammers
 Blue Öyster Cult
 Chelsea Wolfe
 Christian Mistress
 Coven
 Death SS
 The Devil's Blood
 Earthless
 Ghost
 Goblin
 Graham Bond
 Graveyard
 Hawkwind

 In Solitude
 Jacula
 Jess and the Ancient Ones
 Jex Thoth
 Kadavar
 Lucifer
 Luciferian Light Orchestra
 The Obsessed
 Pagan Altar
 Pentagram
 Puppy
 Purson
 Roky Erickson and the Aliens
 Rose Kemp
 Royal Thunder
 The Skull
 Warlord
 Windhand
 Witchcraft
 Witchfinder General
 Witchfynde
 Witch Mountain
 Writing on the Wall

References